exo-α-Bergamotene synthase (EC 4.2.3.81, trans-α-bergamotene synthase, LaBERS (gene)) is an enzyme with systematic name (2E,6E)-farnesyl diphosphate lyase (cyclizing, (–)-exo-α-bergamotene-forming). This enzyme catalyses the following chemical reaction:

 (2E,6E)-farnesyl diphosphate  (–)-exo-α-bergamotene + diphosphate

The enzyme synthesizes a mixture of sesquiterpenoids from (2E,6E)-farnesyl diphosphate.

References

External links 
 

EC 4.2.3